A Lady chapel or lady chapel is a traditional British term for a chapel dedicated to "Our Lady", Mary, mother of Jesus, particularly those inside a cathedral or other large church. The chapels are also known as a Mary chapel or a Marian chapel, and they were traditionally the largest side chapel of a cathedral, placed eastward from the high altar and forming a projection from the main building, as in Winchester Cathedral. Most Roman Catholic and many Anglican cathedrals still have such chapels, while mid-sized churches have smaller side-altars dedicated to the Virgin.

The occurrence of lady chapels varies by location and exist in most of the French cathedrals and churches where they form part of the chevet. In Belgium they were not introduced before the 14th century; in some cases they are of the same size as the other chapels of the chevet, but in others (probably rebuilt at a later period) they became much more important features. Some of the best examples can be found in churches of the Renaissance period in Italy and Spain.

It was in lady chapels, towards the close of the Middle Ages, that innovations in church music were allowed, only the strict chant being heard in the choir.

In England
In the 12th-century legends surrounding King Lucius of Britain, the apostles Fagan and Duvian were said to have erected the Lady Chapel at Glastonbury as the oldest church in Britain; the accounts are now held to have been pious forgeries. The earliest English lady chapel of certain historicity was that in the Saxon cathedral of Canterbury; this was transferred during the rebuilding by Archbishop Lanfranc to the west end of the nave, and again shifted in 1450 to the chapel on the east side of the north transept. The lady chapel of Ely Cathedral is a distinct building attached to the north transept, which was built before 1016.  At Rochester the current lady chapel is west of the south transept (which was the original lady chapel, and to which the current chapel was an extension).

Probably the largest lady chapel was built by Henry III in 1220 in Westminster Abbey. Also in 1220, the office of Warden of the Lady Chapel was established, with the responsibility for the Lady altar, and its sacred vessels, candles and other accoutrements.

Among other notable English examples of lady chapels are those at the parish church at Ottery St Mary, Thetford Priory, Bury St Edmunds Cathedral, Wimborne Minster and Highfield Church in Hampshire. The Lady Chapel was built over the chancel in Compton, Guildford, Surrey; Compton Martin, Somersetshire; and Darenth, Kent. At Croyland Abbey there were two lady chapels. The Priory Church at Little Dunmow was the lady chapel of an Augustinian priory, and is now the parish church. The Lady Chapel in Liverpool Cathedral is another, more recent, example. Consecrated in June 1910, it was designed by George Gilbert Scott and is noteworthy for its size and beauty.

Places

Canada
 The Lady Chapel at the Cathedral Church of the Redeemer in Calgary, Alberta

Ireland

 The Lady Chapel of St Patrick's Cathedral in Dublin
 The Lady Chapel of Christ Church Cathedral in Dublin

New Zealand
 The Lady Chapel at St Paul's Cathedral in Wellington

Russia
 The Lady Chapel at Catholic Church of St. Catherine in Saint Petersburg

South Africa
 The Lady Chapel of St Cyprian's Cathedral in Kimberley

United Kingdom

 The Lady Chapel at Glastonbury Abbey, formerly supposed to be the oldest church in Britain
 The Lady Chapel at Canterbury Cathedral, the probable first Lady chapel in Britain
 The Elder Lady Chapel at Bristol Cathedral in England
 The Eastern Lady Chapel at Bristol Cathedral in England
 The Lady Chapel at Chester Cathedral in England
 The Lady Chapel at Chichester Cathedral in England
 The Lady Chapel at Ely Cathedral in England
 The Lady Chapel at Gloucester Cathedral in England
 The Lady Chapel at Hereford Cathedral in England
 The Lady Chapel at Liverpool Cathedral (Anglican) in England
 The Lady Chapel at Liverpool Metropolitan Cathedral (Catholic) in England
 The Lady Chapel at Manchester Cathedral in England
 The Lady Chapel at Rochester Cathedral in England
 The Lady Chapel at Wells Cathedral in England
 The Lady Chapel at Westminster Abbey (Anglican), also known as the "Henry VII Chapel"
 The Lady Chapel of Westminster Cathedral (RC) in England
 The Lady Chapel of Winchester Cathedral in England
 The Lady Chapel at St Alban's in Southampton, England
 The Lady Chapel at All Saints' in London, England
 The Lady Chapel at St Augustine's in Birmingham, England
 The Lady Chapel at Christ the King's in London, England
 The Lady Chapel at Holy Cross in Crediton, England
 The Lady Chapel at Holy Cross in Waltham Abbey, England
 The Lady Chapel at St Clare's in Liverpool, England
 The Lady Chapel at St David's in Pantasaph, Wales
 The Lady Chapel at St Jude's-on-the-Hill in London, England
 The Lady Chapel at St George's in Birmingham, England
 The Lady Chapel at St Helen's in Ashby-de-la-Zouch, England
 The Lady Chapel at St James the Great's in Haydock, England
 The Lady Chapel at St John the Baptist's in Chester, England
 The Lady Chapel at St Mary's in Stamford, England
 The Lady Chapel at St Mary's in Widnes, England
 The Lady Chapel at St Mary Magdalen's in Woolwich, England
 The Lady Chapel at St Mary Magdalen's in Yarm, England
 The Lady Chapel at St Mary the Virgin's in Stanton Drew, England
 The Lady Chapel at St Matthew's in Oxhey, England
 The Lady Chapel at St Matthew's in Westminster, England
 The Lady Chapel at St Michael's in St Michael Caerhays, Cornwall
 The Lady Chapel at St Michael's in Tilehurst, England
 The Lady Chapel of St Pancras's in Ipswich, England
 The Lady Chapel at St Peter's in Berkhamsted, England
 The Lady Chapel at St Peter's in Sudbury, England
 The Lady Chapel at Holy Trinity in Trowbridge, England
 The Lady Chapel at Windsor Castle, now formally the "Albert Memorial Chapel"

United States
 The Lady Chapel at Manhattanville College in Purchase, New York
 The Lady Chapel at St. Mark's Church, Rittenhouse Square in Philadelphia, Pennsylvania
 The Lady Chapel at Church of the Good Shepherd (Rosemont, Pennsylvania)
 The Lady Chapel at the Basilica of the Sacred Heart, Notre Dame), Indiana
 The Lady Chapel at the Church of the Advent, Boston, Massachusetts
 The Lady Chapel at St. Patrick's Cathedral, (Manhattan).

See also
 Roman Catholic Marian churches
 St. Mary's Church (disambiguation), for independent churches dedicated to the Virgin Mary
 The Lady Chapel, a 1994 novel by Candace Robb

References

Church architecture
Chapels
Shrines to the Virgin Mary
Anglican Mariology
Marian devotions